Events from the year 1879 in Denmark.

Incumbents
 Monarch – Christian IX
 Prime minister – J. B. S. Estrup

Events

Undated
 The Danish Photographers Association is founded as the first organization for professional photographers in the world.
 The Thingvalla Line is founded.
 The Foreningen imod Lovbeskyttelse for Usædelighed is founded.
 Prince Valdemar visits St. Croix in the Danish West Indies.

Culture

Theatre
 21 December  Henrik Ibsen's A Doll's House premieres at the Royal Danish Theatre in Copenhagen.

Births
 16 June – Sigurd Swane, painter (died 1973)
 29 November – Jacob Gade, violinist and composer (died 1963)

Deaths
 24 January – Carl Frederik Sørensen, marine painter (born 1818)
 5 June – Kristian Mantzius, actor (born 1879)
 5 August  Andreas Aagesen, jurist (died 1826)
 30 November – August Bournonville,  ballet master and choreographer (born 1805)

References

 
1870s in Denmark
Denmark
Years of the 19th century in Denmark